Marion Bartoli was the defending champion, but chose not to compete.

Heather Watson won the title after a marathon 3 hour 12 minute battle with Chang Kai-chen. The match saw Watson hold match point before Chang came back and won the second set. Chang went up a break and had multiple match points at 5–4 before Watson broke and won a final-set tiebreak. Watson won by a score of 7–5, 5–7, 7–6(7–4). Watson became the first British player to win the WTA Tour level since Sara Gomer in the 1988 Women's California State Championships.

Seeds

Draw

Finals

Top half

Bottom half

Qualifying

Seeds

Qualifiers

Draw

First qualifier

Second qualifier

Third qualifier

Fourth qualifier

References
Main Draw
Qualifying Draw

Hp Open - Singles
2012 HP Open